Bosoord is a village between Lydenburg and Dullstroom in Thaba Chweu Local Municipality of  Mpumalanga province, South Africa.

References

Populated places in the Thaba Chweu Local Municipality